Alexander Dulerayn (born August 21, 1966, Grozny) is a
Russian producer, director and script writer, general producer of TNT TV
channel (from 2013 to 2017), from 2018 to present –creative producer of the TNT TV
channel, Chief Content Officer of Storyworld Entertainment (from 2017).

Biography 
Alexander Dulerayn was born on August 21, 1966, in Grozny, USSR.

Professional career 
Since 1991, as a producer, script writer and director, he has shot a number independent short-length films.

Alexander Dulerayn was a co-creators of 'CINE PHANTOM CLUB'.

Since 2002, he has been the Deputy General Director, Marketing Director, at the
TNT TV channel.

Between 2008 and 2016, Dulerayn produced and created promotional campaigns for full-length films, such as
'The Best Movie' (box office gross of RUB 400 mln over the first weekend, at the time a record-high figure for
Russian film distribution), 'Our Russia. The Balls of Fate' (over RUB 375 mln) and 'The Groom' (RUB 194 mln over the first weekend). In 2017, the TNT audience exceeded 124 mln people. The channel was an absolute
leader for the 14-44 audience for 6 years in a row and the leader for the 18-30 young audience for 7 years. In 2016-2017, TNT owned 7 out of the 10 series topping search queries on the Russian Internet.

Awards and honors 
 Special prize of New York Film Academy, 1995 – 'Desire to Watch a Film by Rainer Werner Fassbinder'
 Award from the Association of Cinema and TV Producers for Best TV Mini-Series, 2019 - 'Call DiCaprio!' TV Series

Projects

Producer of TV series 
All the above projects were made for TNT.
 RF List of People in Love (2003)
 Bunker, or the Scientist under Ground (2006, multi-series TV film)
 Our Russia (2006)
 Uni (2008)
 Love on the Block (2008)
 Barvikha (2009)
 Barvikha-2. Golden (2010)
 Interns (2010)
 The Probation (2010)
 Zaitsev+1 (2011)
 Golden (2011)
 Uni. New Dorm (2011)
 Girlzzz (2012)
 Through My Eyes (2012)
 Country in the Shop (2012)
 KhB (2013)
 SashaTanya (2013)
 Studio 17 (2013)
 NonEvil (2013)
 People's Friendship (2013)
 Gym Coach (Fizruk) (2014)
 It is always Sunny in Moscow (2014)
 La Dolce Vita (2014)
 Chernobyl: Exclusion Zone (2014)
 Tander Age Crisis (2015)
 Laws of the Concrete Jungles (2015)
 PSC – Private Security Company (2015)
 Infidelity (2015)
 Almost There (2015)
 Beardman (2016)
 The Island (2016)
 Down and out (2016)
 Olga (2016)
 Wasted Inc. (2016)
 Living Together (2017)
 Adaptation (2017)
 Nerd Squad (2017)
 The Street (2017)
 Zheleznogorsk's Theatre (2018)
 House Arrest (2018)
 Call DiCaprio (2018)
 Be Happy (2019)

Producer of TV Projects 
 Winter Spring (2004, short-length film)
 Other Block (2004, short-length film)
 Bedroom Scenes (2005, feature film)
 The Best Movie (2007, full-length feature film)
 Our Russia. The Balls of Fate (2010, full-length feature film)
 BRANDED aka Moscow 2017 (2012, full-length feature film)
 The Groom (2016, full-length feature film)

Director of Cinema Projects 
 Dachniki (Summerhouse Residents) (1991, short-length film)
 Desire to Watch a Film by Rainer Werner Fassbinder (1993, short-length film)
 4 Objects (1995, short-length film)
 The Youth of the Design Engineer (1995, short-length film)
 Reconnaissanceman's Heroic Deed (1996, short-length film)
 Dzenboxing (1998, feature film)
 Ivan-Durak (2002, full-length feature film)
 Offshore Reserves (2004, short-length film)
 Bunker, or the Scientist under Ground (2006, multiseries TV film)
 BRANDED aka Moscow 2017 (2012, full-length feature film)

Script writer of TV projects 
 Draw (1996)
 Dzenboxing (1998, feature film)
 Good and Bad (1999, full-length feature film)
 Ivan-Durak (2002, full-length feature film)
 BRANDED aka Moscow 2017 (2012, full-length feature film)

Family and personal life 
Alexander and his wife live in London with their son and daughter.

References

External links
 Alexander Dulerayn, Ruskino

1966 births
Living people
Russian producers
Russian directors